Santana do Deserto is a small city in Zona da Mata region on Minas Gerais.  As of 2020, the estimated population was 3,981.

References 

Municipalities in Minas Gerais